The Lebanese Second Division is the second division of Lebanese football. It is controlled by the Federation Libanaise de Football Association.The top two teams qualify for the Lebanese Premier League and replace the relegated teams.

Table

League table

2015–16 in Lebanese football
Lebanese Second Division seasons
2015–16 in Asian second tier association football leagues